Jennifer Adcock (born 1982), also known as Juana Adcock, is a Mexican-born, Scotland-based poet and translator. Her first collection of poems Manca appeared in 2014, and was chosen by the Mexican critic Sergio González Rodríguez as one of the best poetry books of the year. Her work has appeared in Words Without Borders, Asymptote, and Glasgow Review of Books. Her book-length translations include:
 Slim: Portrait of the World's Richest Man by Diego Osorno  
 Sexographies by Gabriela Wiener (with Lucy Greaves) 
 Gavia Stellata by Alexander Hutchison
 Historia de un canalla, by Julia Navarro (published under the title The Story of a Sociopath) 
 An Orphan World by Giuseppe Caputo (with Sophie Hughes)

References

Mexican translators
1982 births
Living people